Nathaniel Eaton (17 September 1609 − 11 May 1674) was the first Headmaster of Harvard, President designate, and builder of Harvard's first College, Yard, and Library, in 1636.
Nathaniel was also the uncle of Samuel Eaton (one of the seven founding members and signatories of the Harvard Corporation by charter in 1650).

Biography 
The sixth son of Rev. Richard Eaton (1565–1616), and Elizabeth [Okell?]. Nathaniel was baptised in Great Budworth, Cheshire, 17 September 1609. He was educated at the Westminster School, London, and then attended Trinity College, Cambridge, where he was a contemporary and good friend of John Harvard who at the time was a student at Emmanuel College, Cambridge. He then pursued his studies, obtaining a MD and a PhD from the University of Padua, in Venetia. Eaton later attended the University of Franeker, where he studied under Rev. William Ames. He subsequently emigrated to the New England Colonies on the merchant ship Hector, arriving in Boston on 26 June 1637 in a party which included his older brothers, Theophilus and Samuel along with John Davenport. In the fall of 1637 he was appointed the first "headmaster" of the nascent Harvard College called New College at the time and was awarded 500 acres of land by the General Court of Massachusetts. He erected Harvard's first building, in 1636, called the Old college; named, fenced and planted the Harvard Yard called the College yard; established the colony's first printing press in March 1639, and created its first semi-public library, the Harvard Library.

Around the time that Eaton started teaching at Harvard, an Antinomian controversy had erupted in the Massachusetts Bay Colony. The governor at the time, John Winthrop, was well-noted for his extreme stance within the Puritan community and was greatly feared by many of the colonists. Even those who were Winthrop's close allies, such as Rev. Thomas Hooker, who cofounded the colony of Connecticut, were repulsed by his personality. As such, many left the colony and any Antinomians who didn't leave voluntarily were forced out, banished, or excommunicated (such as Rev. John Wheelwright who founded Exeter, New Hampshire, and his sister-in-law, Anne (Marbury) Hutchinson, who founded a new colony in what later became Rhode Island).

Eaton's older brother, Gov. Theophilus Eaton, led the group along with John Davenport as their religious leader. They intended to start their own settlement – probably due in part to the commanding persona of John Winthrop, Governor of the Massachusetts Bay Colony at the time (1637 to 1640, and many other terms). Winthrop was termed "an object of great fear in all the colonies," and caused the Rev. Thomas Hooker and others to go off and form their own colonies as well. Deciding that he didn't want to be involved in the animosity, he – like Rev. Thomas Hooker before him – founded a new colony, the colony of New Haven, though Winthrop and others literally begged both of them to stay.

In 1639, the year after Theophilus left, Eaton was fired from his job following allegations that he had beat one of his students too harshly and that his wife had supposedly served students hasty pudding with goat dung in it. Eaton's trial gave rise to the concept of court reporters. After the Church of Cambridge attempted an appeal on his behalf, Governor Winthrop refused them, saying that enough evidence had already been presented by several witnesses. The church, however, was able to secure a promise that all subsequent trials would be accompanied by a recording of facts so that defendants and plaintiffs could refer to evidence already presented without witnesses having to go through the entire process again. The only record of Eaton's own supposed "confession" was destroyed in a suspicious fire in the office of the famous historian, James Savage, and his guilt remains in doubt. In the same year as Eaton was fired, he was recorded as owning an enslaved man named "The Moor", of which the students of Harvard complained about having to eat the same food as the Moor.

Henry Dunster succeeded Eaton in 1640 as Harvard's first president, and the first students graduated in 1642.  Dunster also found himself confronting the students, albeit in a sterner fashion, actually having to whip two of them publicly for abusing one of the citizens of Cambridge. However, the students finally triumphed in the situation, and Dunster himself resigned in 1654 over disagreements with the church about infant baptism.

At around the same time that Eaton was dismissed from Harvard, he apparently was also excommunicated from the congregation in Cambridge.  He moved to Virginia in 1640 and then sent for his wife and children who left New England, except for Benoni. According to Winthrop in his History of New England  (known to be full of inaccuracies), the ship in which the family travelled disappeared without a trace. Benoni Eaton, left in Cambridge, was taken in by Thomas Chesholm and his wife, Isobel; Thomas was steward of Harvard College from 1650 to 1660. Through Benoni, Nathaniel has a large number of modern descendants.

Following the loss of his family, Eaton married the widow Anne (Graves) Cotton  (1620–1684), the daughter of Captain Thomas Graves (1584–1635) of Virginia, and served for several years as an assistant to the Anglican curate at Accomac, Virginia before returning to England, where he was appointed the Vicar of Bishop's Castle, Salop, in 1661 and Rector of Bideford, Devon, in 1669.

In 1647 Eaton was finally "exonerated" of a £100 debt that Winthrop misstated as being for £1,000 in his History of New England, ibid, and with which Eaton had supposedly absconded to Virginia in 1640. The exoneration is documented in Henry Dunster's record book for Harvard College as a copy of a letter by two benefactors that Dunster recorded directly underneath his first design of the seal of Harvard College. The 1640 endowment letter was footnoted in 1647 by Theophilus, who wrote:
This money was put wholey into the hands of my brother Nath:Eaton. 9 August 1647. [signed] Theo:Eaton.

Clearly, the intention of the footnote was to indicate that his brother had finally been repaid, and apparently Nathaniel had in part used the money to further his education. As for the £100, Thomas Symonds – a carpenter who had apparently assisted in the building of the college at Cambridge in 1639 and afterwards – was soon found to be in debt to one of the creditors of the college, John Cogan, for exactly the same amount. As stated elsewhere, the college building itself was poorly erected – Symonds being the responsible party after Nathaniel left – and eventually Symonds and at least one of his assistants were thrown into debtor's prison.

Religious convictions 
Nathaniel Eaton's troubles seemed to mount, however, after he graduated from the Jesuit Missionary University. Thus, he left for England around 1652, where he had already been accepted back by the Church of England and honoured as both a vicar and rector (cf. supra), though obviously he had his scruples, and was said to waver back and forth between devotions to his newly found home and that of his former, which he could never return to.

In all likelihood, that "back and forthedness" and covering up set up a scenario of confusion, which seems to have also confused every recordkeeper involved. Ironically, Eaton died in 1674 in King's Bench Prison, where he had been incarcerated for a similar debt: quite probably the same £100 debt from which he had already been given relief. Also, his imprisonment coincided with the restoration of the Stuart Throne, and was likely reposted on an old list that King Charles II's father had kept concerning those of lingering or questionable indebtedness. He was given a burial service on 11 May 1674 at St George the Martyr, Southwark, Surrey, England.

Confusion with Nathaniel Heaton of Boston 

There was also Nathaniel (H)eaton, Heaten, wife, Elizabeth and children, who emigrated on the Griffin with William and Anne Marbury Hutchinson landing on 18 September 1634 in the town of Boston, but who spelled his name "Heaton". This Nathaniell Heaten was made free on 25 May 1636. Nathaniel Eaton of this article had not yet arrive in the Massachusetts Bay. He arrived on the Hector on 26 June 1637, cited above. Nathaniel Eaton, subject of this article, was made a Freeman on 9 June 1638. In 1903 a series of plans of Boston, showing existing ways and owners of property from 25 December 1630 to 25 December 1645 inclusive was published showing the work of cartographer, George Lamb. In these maps #98, Nathaniel Eaton is cited as a property owner in Boston from 1638 to 1645. The subject of this article, Nathaniel Eaton, was known to have left Cambridge in the fall of 1639 and relocated to Virginia by 1640. The Nathaniel Eaton cited in the Lamb map collection is most likely Nathaniel Heaton. This error may have caused further conflation of two distinctly separate individuals, Nathaniel Heaton (Boston), and Nathaniel Eaton, the subject of this article from Cambridge. In The Crooked and Narrow Streets of the Town of Boston – 1630–1822 [note 185] by Annie Haven Thwing, Nathaniel Heaton is accurately cited.

Notes
1.  Cf. Samuel Eliot Morison Builders of the Bay Colony (1930) pp 190–191 where can be found his wife's supposed confession that was obviously coerced. Allegations of embezzlement appear to be ex post facto, or after the fact, and when one compares the entries in: Thomas Lechford's Note Book Kept by Thomas Lechford Lawyer, 1638–1641 (1885), it can be seen that Nathaniel paid all his debts, and was even owed money by Thomas Lechford himself.

2.  Cf. Nathaniel B. Shurtleff, M.D. Records of the Governor and Company of the Massachusetts Bay in New England (1853, vol I) p. 275; and subsequent later trials such as the Salem Witch Trials where it can be seen that testimonies at trial, etc., were thereafter taken down.

3.  According to Cotton Mather's Magnalia Christi Americana (1702), the graduating class of 1642 included the following individuals:
Benjamin Woodbridge
Georgius [George] Downing
Johannes Bulklæus [John Bulkeley]
Gulielmus [William] Hubbard
Samuel Bellingham
Johannes Wilsonus [John Wilson]
Henricus [Henry] Saltonstall
Tobias Barnardus [Barnard]
Nathanael Brusterus [Nathaniel Brewster]

4.  Since then Harvard has been marred by occasional shunnings, chastisements, and forced depositions of their presidents by possibly the most powerful, if not notorious, student body in the history college education.

5.  James Savage, Winthrop's Journal "The History of New England" 1630–1649 (1825–26 edition). There are other versions, including the original 1649 version, but Savage's annotated edition, or its 1853 revision, is considered to be the most comprehensive.

6.  Many spelling variations exist, such as "Greaves" for "Graves". Also, some authorities state that Ann in fact was the daughter of Francis Graves, the son of Thomas Graves. She later married Francis Doughty as her third and final husband.

References

Sources 

 James Kendall Hosmer, editor, Winthrop's Journal 'The History of New England' 1630–1649 (1908 edition) vol. I, p. 314 — Appeal by the Church of Cambridge and the seizing of Nathaniel Eaton's estate. See also: James Savage's footnotes in his edited version of the same above Winthrop's Journal 'The History of New England' 1630–1649 (1825–26 edition)
 Nathaniel Bradstreet Shurtleff, M.D., editor, Records of the Governor and Company of the Massachusetts Bay in New England (1853, vol. I) [1628–1641] by page...
p. 210 – [Eaton] left out of tax rate for 1637 on 20 November 1637 – 
p. 262 – 500 acres [2 km²] of land granted on 6 June 1639 vis-à-vis: "If hee continew his employment wth vs for his life".
p. 275 – Removed from employment on 9 September 1639
p. 275 – Judgements henceforth, after the Eaton Trial, to "bee recorded in a booke, to bee kept to posterity".
(Same day as above: 9 September 1639, and written in after the above "deposition" event. It's probable that the "deposition" was a "first order of business", and not just something anticipated long before "recordation of facts" had even been conceived.)
p. 277 – His estate attached on 5 November 1639
p. 372 – Nathaniell Heaten made free on 25 May 1636 (this is an example of the incorrect conflagration of two distinctly separate individuals, Nathaniel (H)Eaton and Nathaniel Eaton) The Nathaniel Eaton of this article had not yet arrive in the Massachusetts Bay. He arrived on the Hector on 26 June 1637, as detailed above.
p. 374 – Nathaniel Eaton Made a Freeman on 9 June 1638
 Thomas Lechford, Note Book Kept by Thomas Lechford Lawyer, 1638–1641 (1885) p. 236
"I payd Nathaniel Heaton for full of writings & cutting wood. 31 November 1639. 5s". (This is another example incorrectly citing Nathaniel Heaton!)
 Cotton Mather, Magnalia Christi Americana (The Ecclesiastical History of New England) (1702) [7 books; 2 volumes in modern versions]
 John Warren Barber, Connecticut Historical Collections (1837 edition) pp 134–185
 Benjamin Trumbull, D.D., A Complete History of Connecticut (1818) [Also, 2 volumes]
 New England Historical and Genealogical Register (1855, vol. 9) pp 269–271, article entitled "The First President of Harvard College"
 James D. & Georgiana W. Kornwolf, Architecture and Town Planning in Colonial North America (2002) vol 2, pp. 981–986 [Harvard College]
(all preceding dates are in their original Julian Calendar format)

1610 births
1674 deaths
17th-century English Anglican priests
Alumni of Trinity College, Cambridge
American slave owners
History of religion in the United States
Kingdom of England emigrants to Massachusetts Bay Colony
Massachusetts colonial-era clergy
People educated at Westminster School, London
People of colonial Massachusetts
Presidents of Harvard University